The 1990 Iowa gubernatorial election took place November 8, 1990. Incumbent Republican Governor of Iowa Terry Branstad ran for re-election to a third term as governor. On the Democratic side, state representative Donald Avenson won his party's nomination and both Branstad and Avenson moved on to the general election. Branstad won re-election to a third term as governor, defeating Avenson by a margin of over 20 points.

Democratic primary

Candidates
Donald Avenson, former Iowa State Representative
Tom Miller, former and subsequent Iowa Attorney General
Jo Ann Zimmerman, Iowa Lieutenant Governor
John Crystal
Darold Powers

Results

Republican primary

Candidates
Terry Branstad, incumbent Governor of Iowa

Results

General election

Results

See also
United States gubernatorial elections, 1990
State of Iowa
Governors of Iowa

References

Iowa
1990
Gubernatorial